The Chairman of the Maharashtra Legislative Council presides over the proceedings of the Maharashtra Legislative Council. The chairman is elected internally by the Maharashtra Legislative Council. The deputy chairman presides in his absence.

Eligibility
The chairman of the Maharashtra Legislative Council:

 Must be a citizen of India;
 Must not be less than 25 years of age; and
 Should not hold any office of profit under the Government of Maharashtra.

Chairmen
The Maharashtra Legislative Council is headed by a chairperson, elected by members in a simple majority vote. The following is the list of chairpersons of the council.

Deputy Chairman
Neelam Gorhe
24 June 2022 - Incumbent

See also
List of governors of Maharashtra
List of chief ministers of Maharashtra
List of deputy chief ministers of Maharashtra
List of speakers of the Maharashtra Legislative Assembly
List of deputy speakers of the Maharashtra Legislative Assembly
List of leaders of the house in the Maharashtra Legislative Assembly
List of leaders of the house in the Maharashtra Legislative Council
List of deputy leaders of the House in the Maharashtra Legislative Assembly
List of deputy leaders of the House in the Maharashtra Legislative Council
List of leaders of the opposition in the Maharashtra Legislative Assembly
List of leaders of the opposition in the Maharashtra Legislative Council
List of deputy leaders of the opposition in the Maharashtra Legislative Assembly
List of deputy leaders of the opposition in the Maharashtra Legislative Council

References

Lists of Indian politicians